Saint-Joseph Gadji-Celi (born 1 May 1961) is an Ivorian former professional footballer who played as a midfielder.

Career
Born in Abidjan, Gadji-Celi played for Stella Club d'Adjamé, ASEC Mimosas and FC Sète 34.

He was a member of the Ivorian national team between 1984 and 1992, serving as captain of the national team, including at the 1992 African Cup of Nations, which Ivory Coast won.

Personal life
His nephew is fellow footballer Junior Tallo.

References

1961 births
Living people
Ivorian footballers
Stella Club d'Adjamé players
ASEC Mimosas players
FC Sète 34 players
Ligue 2 players
Association football midfielders
Ivorian expatriate footballers
Ivorian expatriate sportspeople in France
Expatriate footballers in France
Ivory Coast international footballers
1984 African Cup of Nations players
1986 African Cup of Nations players
1988 African Cup of Nations players
1990 African Cup of Nations players
1992 African Cup of Nations players
Africa Cup of Nations-winning players
1992 King Fahd Cup players